Jean-Claude Blanc (born 9 April 1963 in Chambéry, France) is a French general manager and former marketing executive of Paris Saint-Germain F.C. and former CEO of Juventus F.C.

Education
Blanc holds an International Business and Marketing degree from Skema Business School and an MBA from Harvard Business School.

Career
Blanc is one of the most experienced sport's marketing executives in Europe having led organizations in different major sports over the last 20 years. Indeed, he managed the Olympics (winter games), the Tour de France (cycling), the Paris Dakar (motor racing), the French Open (tennis), Davis Cup and has been the Chairman and CEO of Juventus Football Club.

Between 1987 and 1992, Blanc was Sales and Marketing / Opening and Closing Ceremony Director for the Albertville Olympic Games in France and worked very close to Jean-Claude Killy, chairman of the Organizing Committee. After earning his MBA at Harvard, Blanc then became the CEO between 1994 and 2000 of Amauy Sport Organization (ASO), a branch of a media company owning and operating the main sporting events in France in cycling, motor racing, and athletics (Tour de France, Paris/Roubaix, Paris/Dakar race, Paris Marathon, etc.). Blanc boosted ASO's revenues and international reach as well as created an all news TV network, L'Equipe TV.

Between 2001 and June 2006, Blanc was nominated CEO of the French Tennis Association and, as such, was the manager in charge of organizing the French Open (Roland Garros), the Paris Master Series, and the Davis Cup / Fed Cup tennis events when staged in France. During his tenure, the French Open reached a new level of development and success thanks to Blanc's innovative ideas, like adding an extra weekend of Grand Slam tennis by starting the tournament on a Sunday instead of a Monday.

Before becoming Chairman of the Board of Juventus Football Club in October 2009, Blanc was brought in as a board member during the club's worst period in history when it was relegated to the second division (Serie B) due to the Calciopoli scandal. Blanc focused immediately on rebuilding the team and the technical staff. He also renegotiated all major business contracts and improved the financial health of the club. The team made a great and immediate come back in season 2006/2007 to the main division (Serie A), reaching an unexpected third place (season 2007/2008), and then second place (season 2008/2009) while operating the club's finances at break even.

Blanc's masterpiece in the last five years has been also to radically modify the new stadium project as well as close the financing for the construction of the new Juventus arena. This arena along with a 35,000 square meters mall is the first to be built in Italy since 1990 and is the only one privately owned by an Italian football club. Blanc has stated many times that the stadium is the future for Juventus, a major revenue-booster and the new soul of the team.

On May 19, 2010, Blanc left his role as Chairman of the Board of Juventus to Andrea Agnelli, son of former Chairman Umberto Agnelli. Blanc retained his role as General Manager and CEO. Agnelli's response to Blanc's confirmed responsibilities was, "He will take care of the operations management of the club at 360 degrees and focus mainly on the development of revenues, managed our international relations with UEFA and FIFA as well as follow up on the stadium project strategic for the future of the Club."

On May 11, 2011, in line with his working contract and in agreement with the owners of the club, Blanc released his executive powers to the Board of Juventus and resigned as CEO. Instead, he became a member of the Board of Directors. However, Blanc tendered his resignation and left the Board of Directors post on October 15, 2011.

References

External links
Juventus Football Club - Official Website
Profile on Juventus.com

Juventus F.C. chairmen and investors
Harvard Business School alumni
Living people
1963 births
People from Chambéry
French expatriates in the United States
French expatriates in Italy
Juventus F.C. directors
French football chairmen and investors
Paris Saint-Germain F.C. non-playing staff